Charles Carroll High School was a public high school located in the Port Richmond section of Philadelphia, Pennsylvania, United States. Its student body was mostly white, black, and latino.

The school was closed in 2013 as part of Philadelphia's shutdown of 23 district-run schools. Displaced students were enrolled in Penn Treaty, Kensington International Business High School, Kensington Health Sciences Academy, and Kensington Urban Education Academy.

Feeder patterns
Feeder K–8 schools included:
 Bache-Martin
 General Philip Kearny
 Spring Garden
 Laura Wheeler Waring

School uniforms
Charles Carroll High School required school uniforms for students;  this consisted of gray-collared shirts and navy blue pants.

See also

External links
 Charles Carroll High School at GreatSchools.net

References

High schools in Philadelphia
School District of Philadelphia
Public high schools in Pennsylvania
Charter schools in Pennsylvania
Spring Garden, Philadelphia